The Monastery of the Forty Saint Martyrs (Iera Moni ton Agion Saranta Martyron) is a ruined Eastern Orthodox monastery overlooking the coastal city of Sarandë in southern Albania.  The monastery was erected during the 6th century AD and possibly became for at least one millennium the most important pilgrimage site in the Ionian Sea region. The name of the monastery (Agioi Saranta in Greek meaning Forty Saints) was transferred to the adjacent city of Onchesmos. During the Peoples Republic of Albania (1944-1991) the site was transformed into a military installation. Today only a part of the side walls of its basilica type church survive.

History
The monastery was probably founded during the reign of Byzantine Emperor Justinian (527–565 AD) and remained a shrine until the communist era in Albania (1944-1991). The complex of the monastery included the basilica church as well as hostels for pilgrims and other guests, underground chambers, holy water springs and crypts. In the underground rooms there were a total of forty small chapels, each dedicated to one of the Forty Martyrs of Sebaste who were martyred during the Early Christian period. During the High Middle Ages the name of the monastery was transferred to the nearby coastal city of Onchesmos. The later developed into the modern settlement of Sarandë.

The monastery remained a major pilgrimage site until the 14th-15th centuries when it suffered repeated destruction due to the Ottoman conquest of the region. However, it attracted again renewed attention in the 18th-19th centuries. The basilica was abandoned and fell into ruins in early 20th century, but part of its high walls were still standing as seen in photographs dating from the early 1930s. The roofless church remained a place of annual religious celebrations on each 9 March. Additionally, a small number of monks appear to be active that time there.

During World War II (1944) the monument witnessed devastating destruction and was reduced to shattered ruins: it was either destroyed by German artillery or Allied aircraft. In the 1950s it was demolished during the atheistic campaign launched by the authorities of the People's Republic of Albania. The site was transformed into a military base, a fact that prevented the preservation of the monument. It remained as such until the Albanian Civil War in 1997.

Much of the massive structure of the basilica has long been demolished today with only parts of its side walls still standing. However, it still retains some religious importance for the local Greek Orthodox population and pilgrims continue to leave flowers there.

Architecture
The church of the monastery was the largest basilica type church in the region and was comparable to those of the episcopal see at Nicopolis. The main structure of the church seems indicative of late antique Christian architecture while it shares parallels to the seven apsed banqueting hall of the palace of Lausos in Constantinople built in c. 530-550 AD.  

The basilica was a building of rectangular shape with a single apse, exonarthex and esonarthex, as well as two small exterior tower structures. The interior included a total of six apsidal chambers. Each one was probably roofed either by domes or half domes as indicated by the pilasters that divide them. Traces of paintings dating from late antiquity appear in at least one chamber. Those depictions include two figures with haloes holding open books and a painted arcade. A crypt is located in the western part of the structure.

A number of dedicatory Greek inscriptions made of broken tile and potsherds have been unearthed on the sides of the structure with some of them dating from the 5th and 6th centuries.

Excavations
In 1913 Greek archaeologist Demetrios Evangelides undertook a survey and excavations at the monastery. During the 1920s Italian archaeologist Luigi Maria Ugolini published the first research about the basilica of the monastery in which he mentioned it as among the finest religious monuments he had studied in Albania. A survey conducted in recent years offers details about its changing architectural styles in addition to its crypts and decoration.

References

Sources

6th-century churches
Buildings and structures in Sarandë
Byzantine church buildings in Albania
Christian monasteries established in the 6th century
Cultural Monuments of Albania
Destroyed churches
Eastern Orthodox church buildings in Albania
Medieval_Epirus
Persecution of Christians in the Eastern Bloc
Christian monasteries in Albania